Hrušanj  is a village in the municipality of Novo Goražde, Republika Srpska, Bosnia and Herzegovina.

References

Populated places in Novo Goražde
Villages in Republika Srpska